Sami Bashir   is a Saudi football player who last played for Al-Hazm F.C.

References

External links 
 

Living people
1989 births
Saudi Arabian footballers
Al-Hazem F.C. players
Al-Faisaly FC players
Najran SC players
Al-Kholood Club players
Saudi Second Division players
Saudi First Division League players
Saudi Professional League players
Association football defenders